
Gmina Męcinka is a rural gmina (administrative district) in Jawor County, Lower Silesian Voivodeship, in south-western Poland.

Neighbouring gminas
Gmina Męcinka is bordered by the town of Jawor and the gminas of Bolków, Krotoszyce, Legnickie Pole, Mściwojów, Paszowice, Świerzawa and Złotoryja.

Villages
The gmina contains the villages of Bogaczów, Chełmiec, Chroślice, Jerzyków, Kondratów, Małuszów, Męcinka, Muchów, Myślinów, Piotrowice, Pomocne, Przybyłowice, Raczyce, Sichów, Sichówek, Słup and Stanisławów.

References

Mecinka
Jawor County